KFLP-FM (106.1 FM) is a radio station licensed to Floydada, Texas, United States. The station serves the Lubbock area.  The station is currently owned by Anthony L. Ricketts.

History
The station went on the air as KLLP on July 2, 1984. On January 28, 1985, the station changed its call sign to KKAP-FM on July 6, 1992, to KFLL, and on February 1, 2001 to the current KFLP.

Today, the station broadcasts a country music format with an emphasis on Texas Country. It also broadcasts all Floydada High School sporting events (football, basketball, baseball, and softball) and is the flagship station of the West Texas Friday Night Scoreboard Show, heard on 50 stations across Texas.

References

External links

FLP-FM
Radio stations established in 1983